The 1993/94 NTFL season was the 73rd season of the Northern Territory Football League (NTFL).

St Mary's claimed their 19th premiership title defeating the Darwin Buffaloes in the grand final by 115 points.

Grand Final

References

Northern Territory Football League seasons
NTFL